The 1988 PSA Men's NCM World Open Squash Championship is the men's edition of the 1988 World Open, which serves as the individual world championship for squash players. The event took place in Valkenswaard and Amsterdam in the Netherlands from 9 May to 13 May 1988. Jahangir Khan won his sixth and last World Open title, defeating Jansher Khan in the final.

Seeds

Draw and results

See also
PSA World Open

References

External links
 

M
World Squash Championships
1988 in Dutch sport
Squash tournaments in the Netherlands
International sports competitions hosted by the Netherlands